Edson Prado is a Brazilian professional bodybuilder and personal trainer.  His wife, Jane, is a professional fitness competitor.

In 2006, he appeared on WWE Raw, in a taped vignette in which he helped Triple H train in preparation for his WWE Championship match against John Cena at Wrestlemania 22.

Personal information
When Prado was 16 years old, he met a friend that was into weight lifting. This exact friend took Prado to the gym for the first time and he continued to go to this gym for many years. After 19 years, the two realized that they would have been able to compete in body building. At the time, Prado's family did not approve of him competing.

Shows participated in
2006 IFBB Atlantic City Pro: 22nd place
2006 IFBB New York Pro
2006 IFBB Shawn Ray Colorado Pro: 13th place
2005 IFBB Europa Super Show
2004 IFBB Night of Champions

Titles Won

 2000 IFBB South American Champion
 2002 NABBA Mr. World

References

Brazilian bodybuilders
Professional bodybuilders
Living people
Year of birth missing (living people)